George's Dock is a stop on the Luas light-rail tram system in Dublin, Ireland.  It opened in 2009 as one of four stops on an extension of the Red Line through the docklands to The Point, opposite the main part of Dublin Port.  It is located in the middle of George's Dock, a road whose two lanes are shared by cars and trams.  The two edge platforms are integrated into the surrounding pavement.  To the east of the stop, trams continue along George's Dock and Mayor Street to the Point.  To the west, the line merges with the branch to Connolly Station, passing Busáras and through the city centre towards Tallaght and Saggart

George's Dock is served by Dublin Bus routes 33D, 33X, 53A, 74, 74A, 90, 142, 151, and 747.

References

Luas Red Line stops in Dublin (city)